Homeobox D10, also known as HOXD10, is a protein which in humans is encoded by the HOXD10 gene.

Function 

This gene is a member of the Abd-B homeobox family and encodes a protein with a homeobox DNA-binding domain. It is included in a cluster of homeobox D genes located on chromosome 2. The encoded nuclear protein functions as a sequence-specific transcription factor that is expressed in the developing limb buds and is involved in differentiation and limb development.

Clinical significance 

Mutations in this gene have been associated with Wilms' tumor and congenital vertical talus (also known as "rocker-bottom foot" deformity or congenital convex pes valgus) and/or a foot deformity resembling that seen in Charcot-Marie-Tooth disease.

Regulation 

The HOXD10 gene is repressed by the microRNAs miR-10a and miR-10b.

See also 
 Homeobox

References

Further reading

External links 
 

Transcription factors